"Per Elisa" (transl. "For Elisa") is a 1981 single composed by Alice (lyrics), Franco Battiato and Giusto Pio (music) and performed by Alice. The song was the breakthrough in the singer's career, winning the 31st edition of the Sanremo Music Festival, and being an international commercial success.

Background
The song marked a second collaboration between Battiato and Alice, following the 1980 moderately successful single "Il vento caldo dell'estate". The title Per Elisa is a reference to Ludwig van Beethoven's composition "Für Elise", whose musical theme is reprised in the intro of the song. 

The lyrics on surface tell the story of a love triangle from the point of view of a betrayed woman, but according to many critics actually refer to drug addiction, with the Elisa of the title being a code name for heroin. In this interpretation, rejected by both Alice and Battiato, the song was included in the soundtrack of the Claudio Caligari's 1983 drug-themed film Toxic Love. 

The structure of the song has been described as "unusual because it lacks a refrain, but equally catchy thanks to several melodic hooks and a smooth mainstream sound".

Track listing

   7" single - 3C 006-18529
 "Per Elisa"  (Alice, Franco Battiato, Giusto Pio)
 "Non Devi Avere Paura" (Alice)

Charts

References

External links
 Per Elisa at Discogs

1981 singles
Italian songs
1981 songs
Sanremo Music Festival songs
Franco Battiato songs